The Late Payment of Commercial Debts (Interest) Act 1998  is an Act of the United Kingdom Parliament enabling businesses to charge other business customers interest on overdue accounts and to obtain compensation. The Act extends to England, Scotland and Northern Ireland.

Originally it was only designed to give small and medium-sized businesses (with 50 or fewer employees) the right to charge interest to larger businesses and public sector organisations of any size.

Statutory interest

The right to charge interest applies to overdue accounts relating to a sale of goods, the hiring of goods or to a supply of services.   The court can modify or exclude the provisions if the conduct of the supplier has been such as to make the imposition of interest, in whole or in part, against the interests of justice.

Interest can accrue from the latest of 
 30 days after the goods are supplied or the service is completed, 
 30 days after receipt of invoice (or the customer is told the amount due is payable).
 the agreed date for payment.

The "statutory interest" rate chargeable, which is simple and not compound, is the Bank of England base rate plus 8%. The increment was set to allow the small business to cover late payments by bank borrowings.

Compensation chargeable

Once statutory interest begins to run in relation to a qualifying debt, the supplier is also entitled to a fixed sum

(a) for a debt less than £1000, the sum of £40;

(b) for a debt of £1000 or more, but less than £10,000, the sum of £70;

(c) for a debt of £10,000 or more, the sum of £100.

Ousting the statutory interest

Parties cannot contract out of the Act's provisions.

However, it is possible to oust the statutory interest requirements, and hence of the compensation provisions, if the contract provides a substantial remedy for late payment, sufficient either for the purpose of compensating the supplier for late payment or for deterring late payment. The meaning of "substantial remedy" will depend on circumstances and as developed in case law. Suppliers can be expected in time to delete other remedies (except against non-business buyers) and rely exclusively on the Act's generous provisions.

Arrangement
The Act consists of three parts.

Part I Statutory Interest On Qualifying Debts
Part II Contract terms relating to late payment of qualifying debts
Part III General and supplementary

Amendments to the original legislation
Late Payment of Commercial Debts Regulations 2002.

The original legislation was altered from 1 November 2000 to allow small businesses to claim statutory interest from other small businesses.

From 1 November 2002, all businesses, including public sector organisations, have been entitled to claim interest from any other business or organisation, including small businesses.

Other legislation
The Reporting on Payment Practices and Performance Regulations 2017, came into force on 6 April 2017. Under the rules introduced in April 2017, all large UK companies are required to publish specific information regarding their payment policies, practices and performance — including the average time taken to pay supplier invoices — twice yearly. This information is made public in a report. As an example according to this report, Capgemini has paid between 16–25% of invoices late, with a maximum payment term of 90 days. Capgemini UK Plc currently has two unsatisfied CCJs (County Court Judgements), with a total outstanding amount of £59,537 owed to their creditors.

See also
 Late Payments Directive

References

Interest
United Kingdom Acts of Parliament 1998
Finance in the United Kingdom